Jim Houghton (born James Carter Houghton; November 7, 1948), is an American actor and soap opera writer. He is best known as an original cast member of CBS prime time soap opera Knots Landing and played the role of Kenny Ward during seasons one through four (1979-1983).

Biography and career
Houghton was born in Los Angeles, California. He is the son of producer Buck Houghton. He began his acting career with appearances in the television shows Man With A Camera, The Twilight Zone, and McKeever & the Colonel. He was an original cast member of CBS daytime soap opera The Young and the Restless where he played Greg Foster from 1973 to 1976. After leaving daytime, Houghton was cast in a leading role in the short-lived CBS action series Code R in 1977.

His most prominent role is that of Kenny Ward, Kim Lankford's character's husband, on the long-running CBS prime time soap opera Knots Landing from 1979 to 1983. During the 1980s, he also guest-starred on Fantasy Island, Hotel, The Love Boat, and Remington Steele. In 1986, he had a small role in the ABC miniseries North and South, Book II and went on to play Cash Cassidy on the ABC prime time soap opera The Colbys(1986–87).

Houghton has appeared in a number of films, including, Sweet Sugar (1972), One on One (1977), I Wanna Hold Your Hand (1978), More American Graffiti (1979), Superstition (1982) and Purple People Eater (1988).

In the 1990s, Houghton returned to The Young and the Restless and also The Bold and the Beautiful as a script writer, a position he held into the 2000’s. He is also credited along with his sister, Mona Houghton, for writing several episodes of the long-running series, Knots Landing.

Awards and nominations
Daytime Emmy Awards
WINS (1992, 1997, 2000, 2006; Best Writing Team; The Young And The Restless)
NOMINATIONS (1993, 1994, 1995, 1998, 1999, 2001, 2003, 2004 & 2005; Best Writing; Y&R)
Writers Guild of America Award
WGA WINS (2002 & 2005 Season; The Young and The Restless)
WGA NOMINATIONS (1999 & 2001 Season; Young and The Restless)

References

External links

American soap opera writers
American male screenwriters
American television producers
Daytime Emmy Award winners
American male television actors
American male soap opera actors
Writers Guild of America Award winners
1948 births
Living people
American male television writers